Churchill Downs is an unincorporated community in Mobile County, Alabama, in the United States.

References

Unincorporated communities in Mobile County, Alabama
Unincorporated communities in Alabama